Temptation (also known as Temptation Island) is a 1959 French drama film co-written and directed by Edmond T. Gréville.

Plot
 
Three young women and a man find themselves isolated on a desert island after a shipwreck.

Cast 
 Rossana Podestà as Caterina
 Dawn Addams as Victoria
 Magali Noël as Jane
 Christian Marquand as Patrick

References

External links

 

French drama films 
1959 drama films
Films directed by Edmond T. Gréville
Films set on uninhabited islands
1959 films
1950s French-language films
1950s French films